Daniel Weber (born 27 February 1990) is an Austrian footballer who plays as a forward for ASK Bad Vöslau.

References

External links
 
 bundesliga.at profile 

1990 births
Living people
Austrian footballers
Austrian expatriate footballers
Floridsdorfer AC players
First Vienna FC players
SV Würmla players
HNK Cibalia players
Austrian expatriate sportspeople in Croatia
Expatriate footballers in Croatia
Footballers from Vienna
Association football forwards